This is a list of airlines currently operating in Turkmenistan.

Scheduled airlines

See also
List of airlines
List of defunct airlines of Asia

Turkmenistan
Airlines
Turkmenistan

Airlines